Maalaea  is a census-designated place (CDP) in Maui County, Hawaii, United States. The population was 310 at the 2020 census. Maalaea is the site of a small boat harbor, as well as the Maui Ocean Center, and a Shinto shrine, as well as being the historical location for the original Maui Airport.

Geography
Maalaea is located at  (20.809336, -156.490729).

Historical Airport
Maalaea is the original site for the Maui Airport, a small, turf runway airport situated near the Oceanside. Inter-Island Airways (Hawaiian) built the airport after being granted permission after a three-year-long fight to secure an airport on Maui. The fight was justified has Inter-Island had already recognized that Maui was going to be the second-largest air traffic hub besides Honolulu, and still is today. Though, many needles were located on the field area from trees that would surely pop airplane tires, though by the time of opening, these had been picked clean as exclaimed by many Inter-Island staff. This field served fine, however, due to the field’s location, it would constantly flood, even after the flood ended the field would be wet for days, and Inter-Island would end up using Kahului Harbor for a landing strip for its amphibian aircraft, the S-38, and S-43.

Demographics

As of the census of 2010, there were 352 people, 196 households, and 81 families residing in the CDP. The population density is 45 people per square mile (36.7/km2). The racial makeup of the CDP was 78.1% White, 2% African American, 0.3% Native American, 9.7% Asian, 5.4% Pacific Islander, 1.1% from other races, and 3.4% from two or more races. Hispanic or Latino of any race were 3.7% of the population.

There were 196 households, out of which 3.6% had children under the age of 18 living with them, 37.2% were married couples living together, 2.6% had a female householder with no husband present, and 58.7% were non-families. 51% of all households were single individuals and 42.3% had someone living alone who was 65 years of age or older. The average household size was 1.56 and the average family size was 2.15.

In the CDP the population was spread out, with 4.5% under the age of 18, 2.8% from 18 to 24, 15.3% from 25 to 44, 44.6% from 45 to 64, and 22.9% who were 65 years of age or older. The median age was 59 years. For every 100 females, there were 114 males. For every 100 females age 18 and over, there were 135 males.

The median income for a household in the CDP was $73,083, and the median income for a family was $101,250. Males had a median income of $53,750 versus $72,708 for females. The per capita income for the CDP was $53,152. About 2.3% of families and 9.7% of the population were below the poverty line, including 16.7% of those under age 18 and 7.2% of those age 65 or over.

Surfing 
The wave called the "Maalaea freight train", is a right-hander off the breakwall and over a shallow coral reef. It is considered to be one of the world's fastest rideable waves, but is rideable only on large southerly swells.

Gallery

Notes

References

External links

Maalaea Community Association web site.

Census-designated places in Maui County, Hawaii
Populated places on Maui
Populated coastal places in Hawaii